Yusa, also known as Tsaraki, was the King of Kano from 1136 to 1194. He was the son of Gijimasu and Yankuma (or Yankuna).

Reign
Yusa ascended the throne in 1136 after his twin brothers Nawata and Gawata died. He is known for building the walls of Kano.

Succession
Yusa died in 1194 and was succeeded by his son Naguji.

Biography in the Kano Chronicle
Below is a biography of Gijimasu from Palmer's 1908 English translation of the Kano Chronicle.

References

12th-century monarchs in Africa
Monarchs of Kano
1194 deaths